Murcki is a district of Katowice. It has an area of 41,53 km2 and in 2007 had 5,796 inhabitants.

References

External links
 
kmmmurcki.pl - unofficial website
Katowice - city website

Districts of Katowice